Bembidion confusum is a species of ground beetle in the family Carabidae. It is found in North America.

Subspecies
These three subspecies belong to the species Bembidion confusum:
 Bembidion confusum aeneorubrum Casey
 Bembidion confusum confusum
 Bembidion confusum marquettense Casey

References

Further reading

External links

 

confusum
Articles created by Qbugbot
Beetles described in 1897